Tomaž Tomšič (born 17 August 1972 in Postojna) is a Slovenian handball player who competed in the 2000 Summer Olympics and in the 2004 Summer Olympics.

References

1972 births
Living people
People from Postojna
Slovenian male handball players
Olympic handball players of Slovenia
Handball players at the 2000 Summer Olympics
Handball players at the 2004 Summer Olympics